Karl Urban (born 1972) is a New Zealand actor.

Karl Urban may also refer to:

Karl von Urban (1802–1877)
Karl Urban (politician) (1855–1940)
Karl Urban (aviator) (1894–1918)